Eldra Patrick DeBarge (born June 4, 1961) is an American singer, songwriter and musician. 
He was the focal point and primary lead singer of the family group DeBarge. Popular songs led by El DeBarge include "Time Will Reveal", "Who's Holding Donna Now", "Stay with Me", "All This Love", and "Rhythm of the Night".

As a solo artist, he is best known for his unique high tenor register, strong falsetto and  hits like "Who's Johnny" and "Love Always". He has also collaborated with artists such as Dionne Warwick, Al Green, Lalah Hathaway, Tone Loc, Babyface, Faith Evans, Quincy Jones, Fourplay, and DJ Quik. DeBarge is a five-time Grammy Award nominee.

Early life 
A native of Detroit, Michigan, El was the sixth of the children born to Robert Louis DeBarge Sr. (1932–2009)  and Etterlene (née Abney) DeBarge.  DeBarge sang in his local church choir and played piano as a child. Later, after his family moved to Grand Rapids, Michigan, he and the rest of his family began performing at their uncle's Pentecostal church. When El was 13, his parents divorced after a difficult and stormy marriage. El is of African American and French descent. Growing up, he was closest to his eldest brother Bobby and began imitating his brother's vocal styling.

For several years, El spent time in private study with music educator Ricky Callier. By 1975, El had begun to express a desire to become a performer. He became a father for the first time at 16 and eventually fathered 11 more children. In 1977, he dropped out of high school and began performing with his elder brothers in clubs and venues in Michigan. By 1979, Bernd Lichters was able to secure a deal with Source Records/MCA to release the Pall Mall Groove – Hot Ice album as SMASH for the USA/Canada market and moved El from Michigan to Los Angeles, to have him, his brothers Mark and Randy DeBarge, in addition to their cousin Andre Abney, Elliot Townsend, and Stanley Hood, to back up the release as the SMASH band.  His eldest sister Bunny joined her brothers in California. In 1980, because of the success of their brothers Bobby and Tommy DeBarge with the hit group Switch, El was able to perform live at the piano and sing in front of Motown CEO Berry Gordy, who immediately signed the group, then known as The DeBarges, to the label.

Motown mentored them, and members later worked with and contributed songwriting, arrangements, and production to the recordings of Switch, including the 1980 albums This Is My Dream and Reaching for Tomorrow. El's first professional recording was as background vocalist to Switch's 1979 hit "I Call Your Name". He later helped to arrange music for several Switch songs including "Love Over and Over Again" and "My Friend in the Sky," which he, Bunny, and Bobby wrote. This song would later be sampled by the likes of Queen Pen and Raheem DeVaughn.

Career 

In 1981, The DeBarges was released after the family had worked in the studio for a year recording it. The album was noted for most of its songs produced and written by all four family members including Bobby DeBarge, who helped end the album track "Queen of My Heart" after El had led the song for most of its tenure. The following album, 1982's All This Love, featured younger brother James and saw much success with the compositions "I Like It" and the title track. El would remain the producer and arranger for all of the group's Motown albums. In 1983, DeBarge released In a Special Way, which spawned the hits "Time Will Reveal" and "Love Me in a Special Way", and in 1984, the band became a sensation while touring for Luther Vandross on the singer's Busy Body tour. Though the group enjoyed much success and appeared to be a family unit, there were growing tensions between El and his brothers, mainly because of Motown's push to have El become the only noted star of the group, repeating a pattern that began with Smokey Robinson and The Miracles. By the end of the tour, El DeBarge was mainly called to handle the production of DeBarge's next album, Rhythm of the Night, without much help from his siblings. The DeBarge family had one more album, Bad Boys, although El and Bunny were not on the album.

Rhythm of the Night became the group's best-selling album ever, although some contended that El DeBarge was the only member present on the album with the exception of the title track, which became a top five hit in several countries including the US and UK becoming the group's and El's signature song. In late 1985, he appeared on The Facts of Life in the Season 7 episode "Doo-Wah" as himself and performed his single "You Wear it Well" with Lisa Whelchel, Kim Fields, Mindy Cohn, and Nancy McKeon singing backup. In 1986, El DeBarge left the group and began his solo career with the release of his self-titled debut album, which spawned the hits "Who's Johnny" and "Love Always". Three years passed, however, until DeBarge released his second album, Gemini in 1989. The album had two hits, "Real Love" and "Somebody Loves You". DeBarge's contract with Motown was terminated in 1990, and he signed with Warner Bros. In the meantime, DeBarge was featured on the Quincy Jones single "The Secret Garden", alongside Al B. Sure!, James Ingram, and Barry White, released in 1990.

In 1992, DeBarge released his third album, the Maurice White-produced In the Storm, which featured the Chanté Moore duet "You Know What I Like", which was Moore's first professional recording. Critics noted the album for its Marvin Gaye-styled productions. El DeBarge later admitted that Gaye was a huge influence on his musical style and once commented that he had initially written "All This Love" as a song he imagined Gaye doing; he even imitated Gaye's ad-libs during his I Want You era near the end. That same year, El had chart success on the R&B charts with a collaboration with Fourplay on their version of Gaye's "After the Dance". DeBarge's next album, 1994's Heart, Mind and Soul, co-produced with Babyface, yielded modest charted singles such as "Slide" and "Where is My Love" (which featured Babyface on duet vocals).

While DeBarge continued to collaborate on other artists' projects, including those of his brother Chico and rapper DJ Quik (with whom El collaborated on Quik's hit "Hand in Hand"), he did not release any more albums between 1994 and 2009. In 2010, he finally emerged from a 16-year delay with the appropriately titled Second Chance, released after a series of comeback performances and appearances, including a well received performance at the 2010 BET Awards. The album yielded two singles, "Second Chance" and the Faith Evans duet "Lay With You", and later resulted in three Grammy Award nominations: Best Male R&B Vocal Performance, Best R&B Song and Best R&B Album. El remains the only member of the DeBarges to have Grammy nominations both outside of the group and in the family.

In 2020, DeBarge made an unexpected return to pop culture after RuPaul referenced his signature mullet on the television show RuPaul's Drag Race. Season 12 contestant Crystal Methyd appeared sporting an identical mullet, much to the enjoyment of RuPaul.

On February 4, 2022, DeBarge performed a Tiny Desk Concert for NPR Music at his home, playing keyboards and singing. The concert was part of a celebration of Black History Month.

Personal life 
DeBarge was raised in Detroit and Grand Rapids, Michigan as a child. His parents had a tumultuous marriage that involved domestic abuse and child abuse on the part of DeBarge's father Robert. DeBarge has remained silent on his relationship with his father and many other elements of his family life, later documented in books written by his mother Etterlene, sister Bunny, and brother Tommy. In 1978, DeBarge became a father to his first child, a daughter named Adris. He eventually went on to father 12 children altogether. DeBarge was close to his siblings, particularly his brothers Bobby and Chico. Bobby's death in 1995 had a profound effect on DeBarge; family members later said he has never fully recovered from it. Since Bobby's death, he has performed several of Bobby's songs with Switch onstage, sometimes with Chico singing along. DeBarge and several DeBarge brothers reunited in 1998 performing several DeBarge classics.

Legal problems and drug addiction 
DeBarge has had a history of drug abuse and legal problems.   He has stated that his addiction started after he began receiving prescription medication for toothache pain after having a tooth pulled by a dentist.

By the mid-1990s, DeBarge's addiction problems resulted in his career faltering after its peaks in the 1980s.  In 2001, DeBarge was arrested for cocaine possession and was given probation. In 2006, he was arrested again for possession of a controlled substance and was once again given probation. In 2007, he was arrested in a domestic dispute and was held without bail; the charges were later dropped. Later that year he was arrested yet again, charged with cocaine possession, and given probation. However, he was once again arrested in 2008 for possession of crack and drug paraphernalia, breaking the terms of his probation. For this violation he was immediately sentenced to two years in state prison in California.

Following a prison sentence for which he served 13 months, DeBarge announced that he had found sobriety after an addiction that he said had lasted nearly 25 years, stating he had also acknowledged his problems with the law in the past. In February 2011, while promoting his 2010 album Second Chance, DeBarge's label announced that the singer was canceling all public dates and appearances as he went back to rehab following a relapse. DeBarge later returned to work and made an appearance at the 54th Grammy Awards in February 2012.

In January 2023 DeBarge was arrested for possession of a controlled substance, drug paraphernalia and having an expandable metal baton in plain sight in his vehicle.

Discography 

Solo albums
 El DeBarge (1986)
 Gemini (1989)
 In the Storm (1992)
 Heart, Mind and Soul (1994)
 Second Chance (2010)

with DeBarge
 The DeBarges (1981)
 All This Love (1982)
 In a Special Way (1983)
 Rhythm of the Night (1985)

See also 
List of number-one dance hits (United States)
List of artists who reached number one on the US Dance chart

References

External links 

1961 births
20th-century African-American male singers
21st-century African-American male singers
African-American male singer-songwriters
American people of French-Canadian descent
American rhythm and blues singers
American rhythm and blues keyboardists
American soul singers
American soul keyboardists
Singers with a three-octave vocal range
DeBarge members
DeBarge family
Living people
American people convicted of drug offenses
Musicians from Grand Rapids, Michigan
Motown artists
Warner Records artists
Interscope Records artists
American tenors
Singers from Detroit
20th-century American pianists
21st-century American keyboardists
21st-century American pianists
American male pianists
African-American pianists
Singer-songwriters from Michigan